ULE may refer to:

 DECT Ultra Low Energy, a wireless communication standard, which is used to create wireless sensor and actuator networks
 Unidirectional Lightweight Encapsulation, a protocol for network layer packets over MPEG transport streams
 ULE scheduler, a computer operating system scheduler
 Ultra low expansion glass, made by Corning Incorporated
 Ule (company), a Chinese e-commerce platform
 Ule (surname), people surnamed Ule